Everest University was an American private university based in Florida. From 2015 to 2020, the schools were operated by nonprofit Zenith Education Group, after former for-profit owner Corinthian Colleges shut down its operations. It was founded in 1940 as Fort Lauderdale College of Business and Finance and later known as the Florida Metropolitan University, a name it held until 2007. The Florida-based university offered online courses for students throughout the country. Programs focused on career orientation, offering day, night, weekend and online programs for working adults, with programs and schedules varying by campus.

History
Founded as Fort Lauderdale College of Business and Finance in 1940, the College was renamed Fort Lauderdale College in 1976. Another name change created the Florida Metropolitan University.  The three remaining schools are branded as Altierus Career College.

Operation by Corinthian Colleges
In 2006, an arbitration process ruled in favor of FMU/Everest and a lawsuit regarding transfer of credits dating to 2004 was dismissed.

In August 2007, an investigation of company practices was closed by the State of Florida with no fines, penalties, or finding of wrongdoing.  The investigation inquired into FMU's "advertising, marketing and business practices related to the sale of educational services to Florida Residents."  The resulting assurance of voluntary compliance between FMU and the Florida Office of the Attorney General indicated that FMU would pay $99,900 to the Office of the Attorney General for its investigation and in contributions to various consumer education purposes. It indicated that FMU would "modify" its pre-enrollment documents to include "Clear and Conspicuous" language regarding credit transfer, its refund policy, and its tuition costs, among other stipulations that, in part, serve to "better train" its teaching personnel to meet certain student needs. The Assurance of Voluntary Compliance found that FMU/Everest participates in the Florida Statewide Course Numbering System to facilitate the transfer of eligible credits to other institutions. Everest University's previous parent company, Corinthian Colleges, is currently being sued by the state of California for "false and predatory advertising, intentional misrepresentations to students, securities fraud and unlawful use of military seals in advertisements."

"According to (California Attorney General) Harris' complaint, CCI's predatory marketing efforts specifically target vulnerable, low-income job seekers and single parents who have annual incomes near the federal poverty line. In internal company documents obtained by the Department of Justice, CCI describes its target demographic as 'isolated,' 'impatient,' individuals with 'low self-esteem,' who have 'few people in their lives who care about them' and who are 'stuck' and 'unable to see and plan well for future.' It is alleged the schools targeted people meeting these targets through aggressive and persistent internet and telemarketing campaigns and through television ads on daytime shows like Jerry Springer and Maury Povich."

In 2012 and 2013, Everest faced site shutdowns as a result of low job placement rates.

In November 2013, Corinthian Colleges reported that they were under investigation by the Consumer Financial Protection Bureau.

Operation by Zenith Education
In February 2015, ECMC, a non-profit education firm, took ownership of more than half of Corinthian Colleges' campuses. ECMC also agreed to forgive student debt on Corinthian College's Genesis loans after a series of years.

Zenith Education Group, a newly created nonprofit provider of career school training, announced in February 2015 that it had finalized its acquisition of more than 50 Everest and WyoTech campuses from Corinthian Colleges Inc., a transaction that was first announced in November. The deal will allow nearly 30,000 students to pursue their career goals without disruption, and will give those students the opportunity to complete their education under new management that is set to implement a new plan to improve the education of its students.

Everest University is now known as Altierus Career College and Career Education. Their program offerings are now limited to associate degrees and career diplomas in Health Care, Trades, Technical, and Business areas.

Campuses
 Houston
 Norcross, Georgia
 Tampa

Accreditation and credit transfer
Everest University lacks regional accreditation. However, the Everest University campuses in Florida were accredited by the Accrediting Council for Independent Colleges and Schools (ACICS) to award diplomas, associate, bachelor's and master's degrees.

Some of the programs offered at Everest University included:
 Accounting
 Applied Management (AS)
 Business (BS)
 Computer Information Science
 Criminal Investigations
 Criminal Justice Bachelors
 Education & Family (grades K–8)
 Master of Business Administration
 Master of Science in Criminal Justice
 Medical Assistant
 Medical Insurance Billing and Coding
 Paralegal

Everest University was accredited by the Accrediting Council for Independent Colleges and Schools (ACICS), which was a formerly recognized accrediting agency by the United States Department of Education. The decision whether to grant transfer credit is left to a post-secondary institution's discretion.

Many regionally accredited universities do not accept credits earned at colleges such as Everest which lack regional accreditation.

Everest University participated in Florida's optional credit transfer program, the Florida Statewide Course Numbering System (SCNS). SCNS was established to facilitate the transfer of students and credits between Florida's public postsecondary educational institutions and participating nonpublic educational institutions, such as Everest University. "Courses that have the same academic content and are taught by faculty with comparable credentials are given the same prefix and number, and are considered equivalent courses. Equivalent courses are guaranteed to transfer to any other institution participating in SCNS, and the credit awarded for these equivalent courses will satisfy the receiving institution's institutional requirements on the same basis as credits awarded to native students." All Florida public universities and colleges participate in SCNS as well as numerous career/technical education centers and nonpublic institutions, such as Everest University. On August 24, 2010, Everest University had 709 courses listed on SCNS.

References

External links
 

Private universities and colleges in Florida
Colleges accredited by the Accrediting Council for Independent Colleges and Schools
Corinthian Colleges
Former for-profit universities and colleges in the United States
1940 establishments in Florida
Educational institutions established in 1940